Anne of Bavaria (or of the Palatinate; ; 26 September 1329 – 2 February 1353) was Queen of Bohemia by marriage to Charles of Luxembourg. She was the daughter of Rudolf II, Count Palatine of the Rhine, and Anna, daughter of Otto III of Carinthia.

Life 
Anna was a member of the House of Wittelsbach. She married Holy Roman Emperor Charles IV on 11 March 1349 in the town of Bacharach on the Rhine. She became the second wife of Charles after the death of his first wife, Blanche of Valois, in 1348. On 26 July 1349 in Aachen, Anna was crowned Queen of Rome. Months later she was crowned Queen of Bohemia. In 1350, Anna gave birth to a son, Wenceslaus, who died one year later, in 1351. Anna did not have more children and died herself in 1353 at the age of 23. Charles was widowed for a second time and still had no son. He then married Anna von Schweidnitz, who gave birth to the desired heir, Wenceslaus, King of the Romans.

Asteroid 
Asteroid 100733 Annafalcká, discovered by Czech astronomer Miloš Tichý at the Kleť Observatory in 1998, was named in her memory. The official  was published by the Minor Planet Center on 12 January 2017.

Ancestors

References 
 

|-

1329 births
1353 deaths
House of Wittelsbach
Women of medieval Bavaria
Countesses of Luxembourg
Wives of Charles IV, Holy Roman Emperor
14th-century German nobility
People of Byzantine descent
14th-century German women
Burials at St. Vitus Cathedral
Daughters of monarchs